Kargovino is a rural locality (a village) in Vinogradovsky District, Arkhangelsk Oblast, Russia. The population was 56 as of 2010. There are 2 streets.

Geography 
Kargovino is located on the Severnaya Dvina River, 46 km northwest of Bereznik (the district's administrative centre) by road. Morzhegory is the nearest rural locality.

References 

Rural localities in Vinogradovsky District